Vladan Dekić (born 10 August 1999) is a Serbian professional footballer who plays as a goalkeeper for Italian  club Viterbese.

Career
After playing for the youth academy of Red Star Belgrade, Dekić signed for Inter Milan, one of Italy's most successful clubs.

For the second half of 2019–20, he signed for Pisa in the Italian second division.

In 2020, he signed for Italian third division side Casertana.

On 5 January 2023, Dekić moved to Serie C club Viterbese.

References

External links
 

1999 births
Footballers from Belgrade
Living people
Serbian footballers
Serbia youth international footballers
Association football goalkeepers
Pisa S.C. players
Casertana F.C. players
U.S. Viterbese 1908 players
Serie C players
Serbian expatriate footballers
Expatriate footballers in Italy
Serbian expatriate sportspeople in Italy